Pentoxydema rostralis, is a species of weevil found in Sri Lanka.

Description
Typical length of the adult is about 7 to 8 mm. Male has a black to piceous body which is moderately shiny. Head elongate, distinctly constricted both dorsally and laterally. Vertex finely and sparsely punctate. There is a large frontal fovea. Eyes are moderately convex. Rostrum very long about 1.5 to 2,0 mm. Rostrum slightly curved, and stout. Antennal punctures are fairly strong, close and even. Prothorax much longer broad and moderately rounded laterally. Dorsum flattened in the middle of the disk, with close and small deep punctures. There is a broad impunctate shiny band found immediately behind the subapical constriction. Elytra much longer than the prothorax and is sub-cylindrical. Pronotal apex is sub-truncate. Elytral striae well marked and containing strong separated punctures.

References 

Curculionidae
Insects of Sri Lanka
Beetles described in 1938